Dinnington Town Football Club is a football club based in Dinnington, Rotherham, South Yorkshire, England.

History
The club was formed in 2000, joining the Premier Division of the Central Midlands League (CMFL). In 2001–02 they finished third and were promoted to the Supreme Division. They won the CMFL League Cup in 2002–03 and finished as league runners-up in 2003–04 and 2004–05. After a third consecutive second-placed finish in 2005–06 (a season which also saw them win the League Cup again) they were promoted to Division One of the Northern Counties East League (NCEL). In 2007–08 they reached the 3rd Qualifying Round in their debut FA Cup campaign, and won promotion to the NCEL Premier Division after winning the Division One title. After winning the League Cup in 2009–10, they were relegated back to Division One at the end of the 2010–11 season.

Close to the end of the 2013–14 season, the club announced they were resigning from the league, subsequently rejoining the Central Midlands League for the 2014–15 season, entering the league's North Division.

Season-by-season record

Notable former players
Players that have played in the Football League either before or after playing for Dinnington Town –

  Jonathan Howard
  Danny Reet

Ground
The club plays its home fixtures at Phoenix Park, based at the Dinnington Resource Centre on Laughton Road, Dinnington. The postcode is S25 2PP.

Gallery
A series of images taken during the Dinnington Town vs. Sheffield Wednesday XI friendly match, 30 July 2008.

Honours

League
Northern Counties East League Division One
Promoted: 2007–08 (champions)
Central Midlands League Supreme Division
Promoted: 2005–06
Central Midlands League Premier Division
Promoted: 2001–02

Cup
Northern Counties East League Cup
Winners: 2009–10
Central Midlands League Cup
Winners: 2002–03, 2005–06

Records
Best League performance: 8th, Northern Counties East League Premier Division, 2008–09
Best FA Cup performance: 3rd Qualifying Round, 2007–08
Best FA Vase performance: 1st Round, 2006–07, 2009–10, 2011–12
Record attendance: 622 vs. Maltby Main, FA Cup, 2007–08

References

External links
Official website

Dinnington, South Yorkshire
Football clubs in England
Association football clubs established in 2000
Football clubs in South Yorkshire
2000 establishments in England
Sheffield & Hallamshire County FA members
Central Midlands Football League
Northern Counties East Football League